The St. Paul's Church is a religious building affiliated with the Catholic Church which is located in the area of Mussafah in Abu Dhabi, the United Arab Emirates. Its importance is that it is the second Catholic church to be built in the emirate since 1965 when the St. Joseph Cathedral was built.

Its history dates back to November 2011 when the municipality granted land in the industrial area of Mussafah, after a work of 18 months of consultation. That same year the first stone of the temple was laid.

It was inaugurated and blessed with the presence of local authorities as the Shaikh Nahyan bin Mubarak Al Nahyan and religious (Cardinal Pietro Parolin) on 12 June 2015.

See also
Apostolic Vicariate of Southern Arabia
St. Joseph's Cathedral, Abu Dhabi

References

Roman Catholic churches in the United Arab Emirates
Buildings and structures in Abu Dhabi
Roman Catholic churches completed in 2015
2015 establishments in the United Arab Emirates
Catholic Church in the Arabian Peninsula
Apostolic Vicariate of Southern Arabia